Techofes is an annual intercollegiate culture festival at the College of Engineering, Guindy in Chennai, India.  The tradition began in 1948. It is a three-day event usually held in mid-February.

Past editions
Techofes '06 took place starting 10 February 2006.
Techofes '07 took place starting 14 February 2007. The special visitor was actor Vikram and the showpiece event was a concert by Vasundra Das.
Techofes '10 took place starting 14 February 2010. It included a special screening of Aayirathil Oruvan at the presence of its director Selvaraghavan. Pro-nite saw a performance by Karthik.
Techofes '11 took place starting 16 February 2011. It saw film making workshops with Gautham Vasudev Menon and Sameera Reddy.
Techofes '12 took place starting 15 February 2012. It included performances of Dhanush, Anirudh and Ajeesh of the then upcoming movie 3 on opening night, a sumo wrestling performance and a live-in concert for composer Yuvan Shankar Raja.
Techofes 2019 took place Starting from February 27 and ending at March 2.

See also 

Kurukshetra (college festival)

References

External links 

 Techofes official website

Culfests